Angelita Velasquez Aquino (born February 7, 1973) is a Filipino actress of film, stage, and television. She is currently signed with ABS-CBN talent management. Aquino is also a fashion model and host.

Aquino is referred to as the "Goddess of Primetime", for her remarkable portrayals in Encantadia: Pag-ibig Hanggang Wakas, Magkaribal, Apoy sa Dagat and FPJ's Ang Probinsyano. She first gained fame when she became a TV host for F!, the longest running lifestyle show of ABS-CBN from 1999, and its successor Us Girls in 2006. Aquino is a recipient of a Gawad Urian Award, CineFilipino Film Festival's Jury Prize, Cinemalaya Independent Film Festival's Balanghai Trophy for 'Best Actress' and multiple FAMAS Award nominations in the 'Best Supporting Actress' category.

Personal life
She graduated from the University of the Philippines Baguio with a degree in Journalism. She has two daughters: Iana (born 1993) and Thea (born 1995). Her daughter, Iana Bernardez, is a producer and actress. Iana also stars on Marry Me, Marry You as Patricia.

Filmography

Television

Film

Awards and nominations

See also 
 Iana Bernardez

References

External links
 

1973 births
Living people
People from Marikina
Filipino television personalities
Filipino women comedians
Filipino film actresses
Filipino television actresses
University of the Philippines Baguio alumni
ABS-CBN personalities
GMA Network personalities
People from Dumaguete